Mohammad al Jillati (born 1945) is a Syrian economist and financial expert, who served as the minister of finance from April 2011 to 9 February 2013.

Early life and education
Jillati was born in Damascus in 1945. He earned a bachelor's degree in economics from the Damascus University in 1967, and a PhD in economics and finance from the former Soviet Union in 1975.

Career
Jillati was a professor at the faculty of economics of Damascus University beginning in 1975 and chairman of the accounting department where for ten years, he participated in several committees of government economic reform plans in the public sector, in addition to the supervision of many doctoral dissertations.

He served as chairman of the society of chartered accountants in Syria for four years and vice chairman of the board of commissioners of the securities commission and the Syrian financial markets from 2005 to 2009. He was acting executive director of the Damascus Securities Exchange from the establishment of the market in February 2009 to 2011.

In April 2011, he was appointed minister of finance in the cabinet of Adel Safar. His term ended on 9 February 2013.

Personal life
Al-Jillati is married and has 5 children.

References

1945 births
Living people
Arab Socialist Ba'ath Party – Syria Region politicians
Syrian Muslims
Syrian ministers of finance